Cisthene batialis is a moth of the family Erebidae. It was described by Francis Walker in 1859. It is found in the Brazilian states of Rio de Janeiro and São Paulo.

References

Cisthenina
Moths described in 1859